Batrachedra enormis, the large batrachedra moth, is a moth in the family Batrachedridae. It is found in Mexico and the southern United States, where it has been recorded from Alabama, Arizona, California, Louisiana, New Mexico and South Carolina.

The wingspan is 28 mm. Adults have been recorded on wing in April, June and from August to October.

References

Natural History Museum Lepidoptera generic names catalog

Batrachedridae
Moths described in 1928